A partial solar eclipse occurred on September 13, 2015. A solar eclipse occurs when the Moon passes between Earth and the Sun, thereby totally or partly obscuring the image of the Sun for a viewer on Earth. A partial solar eclipse occurs in the polar regions of the Earth when the center of the Moon's shadow misses the Earth.

Images

Related eclipses

Eclipses of 2015 
 A total solar eclipse on March 20.
 A total lunar eclipse on April 4.
 A partial solar eclipse on September 13.
 A total lunar eclipse on September 28.

Solar eclipses ascending node 2015-2018 

 Saros 125: Partial Solar Eclipse September 13, 2015
 Saros 135: Annular Solar Eclipse September 1, 2016
 Saros 145: Total Solar Eclipse August 21, 2017
 Saros 155: Partial Solar Eclipse August 11, 2018

Solar eclipses 2015–2018

Metonic series

References

 NASA: Besselian Elements - Partial Solar Eclipse of 2015 September 13

External links 
 http://eclipse.gsfc.nasa.gov/SEplot/SEplot2001/SE2015Sep13P.GIF

2015 9 13
2015 in science
2015 9 13
September 2015 events